John Park Henry (December 26, 1889 – November 24, 1941) was a catcher in Major League Baseball who played for two different teams between the  and  seasons. Listed at 6' 0", 180 lb., Henry batted and threw right-handed. He attended Amherst College.

Career
A native of Amherst, Massachusetts, Henry was a classical light-hitting, good defensive catcher. He entered the majors in 1910 with the Washington Senators, playing for them seven years before joining the Boston Braves (1918).

Heading into the 1912 season, Senators owner Calvin Griffith traded catcher Gabby Street to the New York Highlanders for third baseman John Knight. Then Henry shared duties with Eddie Ainsmith, serving as the personal catcher for pitcher Walter Johnson. His most productive season came in 1916, when he posted career-numbers in games (117), batting average (.249), runs (28), extrabases (15) and runs batted in (46). Henry would manage to stick around in a part-time role until 1917, when he was sold to the Braves.

In a nine-season career, Henry was a .207 hitter (397-for-1920) with two home runs and 171 RBI in 688 games, including 161 runs, 54 doubles, 15 triples, 55 stolen bases, and a .303 on-base percentage.

Following his playing career, Henry coached at Cornell University and later became a Minor league umpire.

Henry died in Fort Huachuca, Arizona, at the age of 51.

See also
 1916 Washington Senators season

References

External links

 Retrosheet

1889 births
1941 deaths
Major League Baseball catchers
Boston Braves players
Washington Senators (1901–1960) players
Cornell Big Red baseball coaches
Amherst Mammoths baseball players
Sportspeople from Amherst, Massachusetts
Baseball players from Massachusetts
Minneapolis Millers (baseball) players
Columbus Senators players
Shreveport Gassers players
San Antonio Bears players
Mobile Bears players
People from Fort Huachuca, Arizona